Sanjeev Tiwari is an Indian singer, lyricist, story, screenplay, and dialogue writer of Bollywood working in Tollywood also. Sanjeev Tiwari was a renowned radio personality from Kolkata and received the best male RJ award in 2007. We was in Radio for about 15 years right from the beginning of FM Radio in India. He last worked as the national music manager with MY Fm. Conducted many radio workshops. He has also lend his voice for many commercials & dubbed for many projects. He has recently launched his own music channel called ‘sunoज़रा’.

Career

He has written story, screenplays and dialogues for television shows like Savdhaan India for Life Ok, and Gumrah: End of Innocence for Channel V. He wrote the title track for life Ok's serial Meri Maa, Zee TV's serial "Bhutu" dialogues for the film Bloody Isshq, and lyrics for the films Sooper Se Ooper, Morning Walk, Jal, Via Darjeeling, Yatra, Devaki, Chowky and Hothat Brishti. He has written and composed songs for Bollywood films including Hotel Beautifool.

Sanjeev wrote the dialogues & lyrics for television serial Jai Kanhaiya Lal Ki on Star Bharat(2018). His songs (Bholey Baba) and (Shundori komola) are chart busters in his first venture into the Tollywood film industry as a lyricist for the movie "Villain (2018 film)" featuring Ankush Hazra, Mimi Chakraborty and Rittika Sen, the movie has been directed by Baba Yadav and both the songs have been composed by Subhadeep Mitra under the banner of "Shree Venkatesh Films",. His latest is song 'Naina' from the album Ishq composed by Bickram Ghosh & sung by Hariharan. In 18 February 2022 a film was released called Before You Die Sanjeev has written the Screenplay & Dialogue.

Filmography

Television

References

Living people
Year of birth missing (living people)
Indian male composers
Indian radio presenters
Indian male screenwriters